Triton is a British period television drama series which aired in four parts on BBC 1 in 1961. Set during the Napoleonic Wars, two Royal Navy officers go on an undercover mission to France discover Napoleon's secret weapon for his planned invasion of Britain. It turns out to be a submarine designed by the American Robert Fulton, widely credited as the inventor of the first steamship.

It was written, produced and directed by Rex Tucker. Unlike many BBC programmes of the early 60s, it is believed all four episodes have survived. In 1968 the story was remade by the BBC in another four part serial of the same title, which also exists with the British Film Institute.

Main cast
 William Russell as Captain Belwether
 Francis Matthews as  Lieutenant Lamb
 Reed De Rouen as Robert Fulton
 Robert James as Lord Nelson
 Anthony Sharp as  Sir Home Popham
 Selma Vaz Dias as Madame Victor
 Michael Anthony as Interpreter
 Jacques Cey as  French Captain
 Roger Delgado as The Man with the Patch

References

Bibliography
Ellen Baskin. Serials on British Television, 1950-1994. Scolar Press, 1996.
 Sue Parrill. Nelson's Navy in Fiction and Film: Depictions of British Sea Power in the Napoleonic Era. McFarland, 2009.

External links
 

BBC television dramas
1961 British television series debuts
1961 British television series endings
English-language television shows